Europium oxide is a compound from the two elements europium and oxygen.

Europium oxide may refer to:
 Europium(II) oxide (europium monoxide, EuO) a magnetic semiconductor.
 Europium(III) oxide (europium sesquioxide, Eu2O3), the most common oxide.

Europium compounds